Peronia is a genus of air-breathing sea slugs, a shell-less marine pulmonate gastropod mollusks in the family Onchidiidae. These slugs differ from other onchidiid slugs in having branched "gills" on their dorsal side, although these can be retracted. More than two dozen species of Peronia have been described from the Indo-West Pacific, but a recent revision of the genus determined that 21 of these names are synonyms. Nine species of Peronia are recognized, most of which can differentiated only by examining their internal anatomy or with DNA sequencing.

Species
The following species are species currently recognized within the genus Peronia:
 Peronia anomala Labbé, 1934
 Peronia griffithsi Dayrat & Goulding, 2017
Peronia madagascariensis (Labbé, 1934)
 Peronia okinawensis  Dayrat & Goulding, 2020
 Peronia peronii (Cuvier, 1804)
Peronia platei (Hoffman, 1928)
Peronia setoensis Dayrat & Goulding, 2020
Peronia sydneyensis Dayrat & Goulding, 2020
 Peronia verruculata (Cuvier, 1830)
Peronia willani Dayrat & Goulding, 2020

References

Onchidiidae